Sorkhakan (also Romanized as Sorkhakān and Sorkhekān; also known as Sorkhagān, Sorkhegān, Sorkh Kūh, and Surkh Kān) is a village in Negar Rural District, in the Central District of Bardsir County, Kerman Province, Iran. At the 2006 census, its population was 338, in 80 families.

References 

Populated places in Bardsir County